Lac de Pététoz is a lake in Haute-Savoie, France.

Petetoz, Lac